The Medina Museum is located in Braga, Portugal, in the same building of the Pius XII Museum

The collection comprises 83 oil paintings and 21 drawings of the naturalist painter Henrique Medina. Among the collection there are many portraits, still life and landscapes.

The museum was inaugurated on 21 June 1984.

Henrique Medina (1901-1988) was born in Porto where he graduated in art. He also studied in Paris, Rome and London. His work is represented in many different museums in Portugal and other countries.

See also
 List of Jesuit sites
 List of single-artist museums

References

Museums in Braga
Biographical museums in Portugal
Museums established in 1984
Art museums and galleries in Portugal
Medina